Daniel Thomas Batty (born 10 December 1997) is an English professional footballer who plays for  side Fleetwood Town as a midfielder.

Club career

Hull City 
After starting his career at Leeds United from the age of 5, Batty was released by Leeds at under 16's level, after being released by Leeds, Batty joined Hull City at the age of 15 and was involved with the first team squad on several occasions during the 2016–17 season. On 22 August 2017, he made his debut in a 2–0 EFL Cup defeat to Doncaster Rovers. On 6 May 2018, he made his full league debut for the club in the final match of the 2017–18 season, a 1–1 away draw to Brentford.
On 11 June 2020, Batty agreed a short-term contract extension to cover the extended 2019–20 season, and on 26 June 2020, the club took up an option for a year extension to his contract.

FC Halifax Town (loan) 
On 27 October 2017, Batty moved on a month-long loan spell to FC Halifax Town. He made his debut the following day away to Tranmere Rovers, scoring the second goal in a 2–4 defeat.

Fleetwood Town
On 1 February 2021, Batty moved to Fleetwood Town after his contract with Hull City was terminated by mutual consent.

Statistics

References 

1997 births
Living people
English footballers
Association football midfielders
Hull City A.F.C. players
FC Halifax Town players
Fleetwood Town F.C. players
English Football League players
National League (English football) players